The ICC Awards of the Decade is a one-off edition of the ICC Awards annual awards programme, aimed at celebrating the stand-out performers and moments from the past ten years of international cricket. An Awards Nominations Committee, comprising prominent cricket journalists and broadcasters from across the globe and the ICC General Manager – Cricket, have determined a shortlist of nominees for each category. For the first time the fans’ voice will be heard in selecting the winners across categories including the Sir Garfield Sobers and Rachael Heyhoe Flint Awards, which celebrate the best overall player from the men's and women's game over the past decade. The fan vote will make up 10% of the voting, while votes from an expert panel will make up the remaining 90%. The voting panel took into account players' performance between 1 January 2011 and 7 October 2020. The announcement of the ICC World XI Teams, along with the winners of the individual ICC awards, was made on 28 December 2020. Virat Kohli won Men's Cricketer of the Decade.

Award categories and winners

Individual awards

ICC Teams of the Decade

Men's teams 

ICC Men's Test Team of the Decade

 ICC Men's ODI Team of the Decade

 ICC Men’s T20I Team of the Decade

Women's teams 

 ICC Women's ODI Team of the Decade

 ICC Women's T20I Team of the Decade

Nominations
The following are the nominations for the ICC Awards of the Decade: Winners have been announced and are mentioned in the chart above

ICC Male Cricketer of the Decade

 Virat Kohli
 Ravichandran Ashwin
 Joe Root
 Kumar Sangakkara
 Steve Smith
 AB de Villiers
 Kane Williamson

ICC Female Cricketer of the Decade
 Suzie Bates
 Meg Lanning
 Ellyse Perry
 Mithali Raj
 Sarah Taylor
 Stafanie Taylor

ICC Men's Test Cricketer of the Decade
 James Anderson
 Rangana Herath
 Joe Root
 Yasir Shah
 Steve Smith
 Kane Williamson

ICC Men’s ODI Cricketer of the Decade

 Virat Kohli
 Lasith Malinga
 Kumar Sangakkara
 Rohit Sharma
 Mitchell Starc
 AB de Villiers

ICC Women’s ODI Cricketer of the Decade
 Suzie Bates
 Meg Lanning
 Ellyse Perry
 Mithali Raj
 Stafanie Taylor

ICC Men's T20I Cricketer of the Decade
 Aaron Finch
 Chris Gayle
 Rashid Khan
 Lasith Malinga
 Rohit Sharma
 Imran Tahir

ICC Women’s T20I Cricketer of the Decade
 Sophie Devine
 Deandra Dottin
 Alyssa Healy
 Meg Lanning
 Anya Shrubsole
 Ellyse Perry

ICC Men's Associate Cricketer of the Decade
 Richie Berrington
 Peter Borren
 Kyle Coetzer
 Paras Khadka
 Calum MacLeod
 Assad Vala

ICC Women's Associate Cricketer of the Decade
 Kathryn Bryce
 Sarah Bryce
 Natthakan Chantam
 Sterre Kalis
 Chanida Sutthiruang
 Sornnorin Tippoch

ICC Spirit of Cricket Award of the Decade 

 MS Dhoni (2011 Winner)
 Daniel Vettori (2012 Winner)
 Mahela Jayawardene (2013 Winner)
 Katherine Brunt (2014 Winner)
 Brendon McCullum (2015 Winner)
 Misbah-ul-Haq (2016 Winner)
 Anya Shrubsole (2017 Winner)
 Kane Williamson (2018 Winner)
 Virat Kohli (2019 Winner)

See also

 International Cricket Council
 ICC Awards
 Sir Garfield Sobers Trophy (Cricketer of the Year)
 ICC Test Player of the Year
 ICC ODI Player of the Year
 David Shepherd Trophy (Umpire of the Year)
 ICC Women's Cricketer of the Year
 ICC Test Team of the Year
 ICC ODI Team of the Year

References

International Cricket Council awards and rankings
Crick
2020 in cricket